In finance, a perpetual futures contract, also known as a perpetual swap, is an agreement to non-optionally buy or sell an asset at an unspecified point in the future. Perpetual futures are cash-settled, and differ from regular futures in that they lack a pre-specified delivery date, and can thus be held indefinitely without the need to roll over contracts as they approach expiration. Payments are periodically exchanged between holders of the two sides of the contracts, long and short, with the direction and magnitude of the settlement based on the difference between the contract price and that of the underlying asset, as well as, if applicable, the difference in leverage between the two sides.

Perpetual futures were first proposed by economist Robert Shiller in 1992, to enable derivatives markets for illiquid assets. However, perpetual futures markets have only developed for cryptocurrencies, following their introduction in 2016 by BitMEX. Cryptocurrency perpetuals are characterised by the availability of high leverage, sometimes over 100 times the margin, and by the use of auto-deleveraging, which compels high-leverage, profitable traders to forfeit a portion of their profits to cover the losses of the other side during periods of high market volatility, as well as insurance funds, pools of assets intended to prevent the need for auto-deleveraging.

Perpetuals serve the same function as contracts for difference (CFDs), allowing indefinite, leveraged tracking of an underlying asset or flow, but differ in that a single, uniform contract is traded on an exchange for all time-horizons, quantities of leverage, and positions, as opposed to separate contracts for separate quantities of leverage typically traded directly with a broker.

History 
Holding a futures contract indefinitely requires periodically rolling over the contract into a new one before the contract's expiry. However, given that futures prices typically differ from spot prices, repeatedly rolling over contracts creates significant basis risk, leading to inefficiencies when used for hedging or speculation. In an attempt to remedy these ills, the Chinese Gold and Silver Exchange of Hong Kong developed an "undated futures" market, wherein one-day futures would be rolled over automatically, with the difference between future and spot prices settled between the counterparties.

In 1992, Robert Shiller proposed perpetual futures, alongside a method for generating asset-price indices using hedonic regression, accounting for unmeasured qualities by adding dummy variables that represent elements of the index, indicating the unique quality of each element, a form of repeated measures design. This was intended to permit the creation of derivatives markets for illiquid, infrequently-priced assets, such as single-family homes, as well as untraded indices and flows of income, such as labour costs or the consumer price index.

Mechanism 
Perpetual futures for the value of a cash flow, dividend or index, as envisioned by Shiller, require the payment of a daily settlement, intended to mirror the value of the flow, from one side of the contract to the other. At any day t, the dividend , paid from shorts to longs, is defined as:

See also 

 Futures contract
 Contract for difference

References 

Derivatives (finance)
Futures markets
Cryptocurrencies